Fringe is an ornamental textile trim applied to an edge of a textile item, such as drapery, a flag, or epaulettes.

Fringe originated as a way of preventing a cut piece of fabric from unraveling when a hemming was not used. Several strands of weft threads would be removed, and the remaining warp threads would be twisted or braided together to prevent unraveling. In modern fabrics, fringe is more commonly made separately and sewn on. Modern "add-on" fringe may consist of wool, silk, linen, or narrow strips of leather. The use of fringe is ancient, and early fringes were generally made of unspun wool (rather than spun or twisted threads).

There are many types of fringe. Particularly in Western Europe, as wealth and luxury items proliferated during the Renaissance, types of fringe began to assume commonly accepted names. Styles of fringes were clearly defined in England by at least 1688.

Type of fringe include:
Bullion fringe, twisted yarn which generally contains threads of silver or gold. The name derives from bullion hose, which had a twisted element at the top that resembled this type of fringe. Modern bullion fringe varies widely in texture and width, but generally is only  in length.
Campaign fringe, from the French word campane (meaning "bell"), consists of small, bell-like tassels on the end.
Thread fringe, untwisted and unbraided loose warp threads.

References

Further reading

 Pegler, Martin M. The Dictionary of Interior Design. Fairchild Publications: 1983. 

Decorative ropework
Notions (sewing)
Parts of clothing
Western wear